OBW may refer to:

Ohio Brew Week, a festival held annually in Athens, Ohio
On Broken Wings, an American metalcore band
OB West, the German Army Command in the West during World War II